Radek Veselý (born May 5, 1996) is a Czech professional ice hockey player currently signed to Romanian Erste Liga on HSC Csíkszereda. He last played for Coventry Blaze in the UK's Elite Ice Hockey League (EIHL). Veselý was previously with AZ Havířov of the Czech 1.liga.

Veselý made his Czech Extraliga debut playing with Piráti Chomutov during the 2015-16 Czech Extraliga season.

References

External links

1996 births
Living people
AZ Havířov players
Coventry Blaze players
Czech ice hockey forwards
HC Benátky nad Jizerou players
HC Litvínov players
HC Most players
HSC Csíkszereda players
People from Pelhřimov
Piráti Chomutov players
Rovaniemen Kiekko players
Sportovní Klub Kadaň players
Sportspeople from the Vysočina Region
Czech expatriate ice hockey people
Czech expatriate sportspeople in Romania
Czech expatriate sportspeople in England
Expatriate ice hockey players in England
Czech expatriate ice hockey players in Finland